The 2019 ESPY Awards were presented at the 27th annual ESPY Awards show, held on July 10, 2019 at 5 PM Pacific at the Microsoft Theater in Los Angeles and broadcast on television nationwide in the United States on ABC at 8 PM Eastern/7 PM Central. Tracy Morgan served as the host.

Winners and nominees 
{| class=wikitable
|-
| valign="top" width="50%"|

Giannis Antetokounmpo – Milwaukee Bucks, NBA
Mookie Betts – Boston Red Sox, MLB
Brooks Koepka – Golf
Patrick Mahomes – Kansas City Chiefs, NFL
| valign="top" width="50%"|

Alex Morgan - Orlando Pride, United States women's national soccer team
Simone Biles – Gymnast
Mikaela Shiffrin – Skiing
Breanna Stewart – Seattle Storm, WNBA; Dynamo Kursk, EuroLeague Women; United States women's national basketball team
|-
| valign="top" width="50%"|

Saquon Barkley – New York Giants, NFL
Naomi Osaka – Tennis
Christian Yelich – Milwaukee Brewers, MLB
Trae Young – Atlanta Hawks, NBA
| valign="top" width="50%"|

U.S. Women's Soccer Team – FIFA
Boston Red Sox – MLB
New England Patriots – NFL
Clemson Tigers – NCAA Division I FBS football
Toronto Raptors – NBA
Baylor Lady Bears – NCAA women's basketball
Virginia Cavaliers – NCAA men's basketball
|-
| valign="top" width="50%"|

Los Angeles Rams defeat Kansas City Chiefs 54–51 on Monday Night Football
Texas A&M defeats LSU 74–72 in seven overtimes in highest scoring NCAA FBS game in history
Notre Dame defeats UConn 81–76 in the 2019 NCAA Women's Final Four
| valign="top" width="50%"|

Katelyn Ohashi (UCLA) scores a Perfect 10 in gymnastics floor exercise
Miracle in Miami (advanced to Finals)
Kawhi Leonard's game-winning buzzer-beater that advanced the Toronto Raptors to the Eastern Conference finals (advanced to Finals)
Derrick Henry runs for an NFL record tying 99-yard TD (advanced to Finals)
Wayne Rooney single-handedly won a game for D.C. United
Andrew Benintendi calls game
Damian Lillard's buzzer-beater that sent the Portland Trail Blazers in the Western Conference playoffs and eliminated the Oklahoma City Thunder (advanced to Round 2)
Midlothian, Virginia QB Brendon Clark throws a 48-yard TD pass to Kevin Henderson that popped behind his opponent's head
Texas Tech wide receiver T. J. Vasher does his best Odell Beckham Jr. imitation (advanced to Round 2)
Kinsley Washington singled home Jacqui Prober to win UCLA's 12th Women's College World Series softball title
Julie Ertz scores a goal against Brazil early in the second half of their Tournament of Nations match (advanced to Round 2)
Texas A&M's Infinite Tucker goes for the gold at the SEC Outdoor Track & Field Championships
Arike Ogunbowale behind-the-back pass (advanced to Round 2)
Kihei Clark and Mamadi Diakite save Virginia at the buzzer in the Elite Eight
Wilmington Charter's Taylor Gillis with a sensational catch
North Shore Senior High School wins Texas state title with Hail Mary pass
|-
| valign="top" width="50%"|Zion Williamson – Duke Blue DevilsRachel Garcia – UCLA Bruins
Sabrina Ionescu – Oregon Ducks
Kyler Murray – Oklahoma Sooners
| valign="top" width="50%"|Drew Brees surpassing Peyton Manning's 71,940 NFL passing yards on Monday Night Football; he also surpassed Brett Favre's completion recordMatthew Boling breaks the national high school record for the boys' 100 meter dash.
Sabrina Ionescu scoring her 13th triple double in her NCAA career, making her the record holder for most triple doubles, male or female, in NCAA history
Klay Thompson scoring 14 3-point field goals in an NBA game, breaking Stephen Curry's previous record
|-
| valign="top" width="50%"|Patrick Mahomes – Kansas City ChiefsDrew Brees – New Orleans Saints
Aaron Donald – Los Angeles Rams
Todd Gurley – Los Angeles Rams
| valign="top" width="50%"|Christian Yelich – Milwaukee BrewersMookie Betts – Boston Red Sox
Jacob DeGrom – New York Mets
Blake Snell – Tampa Bay Rays
|-
| valign="top" width="50%"|Giannis Antetokounmpo – Milwaukee BucksKevin Durant – Golden State Warriors
Paul George – Oklahoma City Thunder
James Harden – Houston Rockets
| valign="top" width="50%"|Alexander Ovechkin – Washington CapitalsNikita Kucherov – Tampa Bay Lightning
Connor McDavid – Edmonton Oilers
Nathan McKinnon – Colorado Avalanche
|-
| valign="top" width="50%"|Zlatan Ibrahimović – LA GalaxyJosef Martínez – Atlanta United
Aaron Long – New York Red Bulls
Wayne Rooney – D.C. United
| valign="top" width="50%"|Sam Kerr – Chicago Red StarsAbby Erceg – North Carolina Courage
Adrianna Franch – Portland Thorns
Lindsey Horan – Portland Thorns
|-
| valign="top" width="50%"|Lionel Messi – FC Barcelona/ArgentinaKylian Mbappé – Paris Saint-Germain F.C./France
Cristiano Ronaldo – Juventus F.C./Portugal
Virgil Van Dijk – Liverpool F.C./Netherlands
| valign="top" width="50%"|Sam Kerr – Chicago Red Stars/Perth Glory/AustraliaPernille Harder – VfL Wolfsburg/Denmark
Ada Hegerberg – Olympique Lyonnais/Norway
Lucy Bronze – Olympique Lyonnais/England
|-
| valign="top" width="50%"|Breanna Stewart – Seattle StormElena Delle Donne – Washington Mystics
Candace Parker – Los Angeles Sparks
Diana Taurasi – Phoenix Mercury
| valign="top" width="50%"|Kyle Busch – NASCARScott Dixon – IndyCar
Lewis Hamilton – Formula One
Steve Torrence – NHRA
|-
| valign="top" width="50%"|Brooks KoepkaFrancesco Molinari
Justin Rose
Tiger Woods
| valign="top" width="50%"|Brooke HendersonAriya Jutanugarn
Jin-Young Ko
Sung Hyun Park
|-
| valign="top" width="50%"|Canelo ÁlvarezTerence Crawford
Vasily Lomachenko
Oleksandr Usyk
| valign="top" width="50%"|Daniel CormierIsrael Adesanya
Henry Cejudo
Amanda Nunes
|-
| valign="top" width="50%"|Mike E. SmithFlorent Geroux
Irad Ortiz Jr.
José Ortiz
| valign="top" width="50%"|Andy Ruiz Jr. defeats Anthony Joshua in a heavyweight title fightColumbus Blue Jackets sweep the top-seeded Tampa Bay Lightning in the first round of the 2019 Stanley Cup playoffs
Old Domininon defeats #13 Virginia Tech
Naomi Osaka beats Serena Williams at the 2018 US Open
|-
| valign="top" width="50%"|Nyjah Huston – SkateboardingScotty James – Snowboarding
Gabriel Medina – Surfing
Tom Pagès – Freestyle Motocross
| valign="top" width="50%"|Chloe Kim – SnowboardingStephanie Gilmore – Surfing
Zoi Sadowski-Synnott – Snowboarding
Kelly Sildaru – Skiing
|-
| valign="top" width="50%"|Mark Barr – triathlonDeclan Farmer – sledge hockey
Daniel Romanchuk – marathon racing
Oz Sanchez – cycling
| valign="top" width="50%"|Allysa Seely – triathlonOksana Masters – Nordic skiing
Tatyana McFadden – marathon racing
Shawn Morelli – cycling
|-
| valign="top" width="50%"|Katelyn Ohashi scores a perfect 10 in gymnasticsTexas A&M athlete Infinite Tucker lunges for the gold at the SEC Championships
Sister Mary Jo's first pitch at a Chicago White Sox game is a curveball
| valign="top" width="50%"|Roman Reigns returns to action following a recurrence of leukemiaBecky Lynch wins Raw and SmackDown Women's titles at the main event of WrestleMania 35
Kofi Kingston wins the WWE Championship after 11 years at WrestleMania 35
Ronda Rousey wins the Raw Women's title at Summerslam
|-
| valign="top" width="50%"|Norm DukeJason Belmonte
Jakob Butturff
Anthony Simonsen
| valign="top" width="50%"|OLarry returns to NBA 2K League following Jacksonville Landing shootingSonicFox winning Evo after switching sides
Team Liquid upsets defending world champ Invictus Gaming at MSI
Cloud9 wins CS:GO Boston Major
Astralis winning Katowice
Invictus Gaming League of Legends World Championship
Spitfire win inaugural Overwatch League championship
Serral winning StarCraft at BlizzCon
Shanghai Dragons end 42-game losing streak
Team OG wins The International and $11 million from qualifiers
Chiquita Evans becoming the first woman in the NBA 2K League
Leffen finally winning EVO in what could be Super Smash Bros: Melees last year at the event
Ninja Fortnite win with Marshmello at E3 ProAM
Chritobin Madden Challenge walk off
G2 Esports wins Rainbow Six world championship
Mongausse winning Summer Skirmish from out of nowhere
|-
| valign="top" width="50%"|Roger FedererNovak Djokovic
Rafael Nadal
Stefanos Tsitsipas
| valign="top" width="50%"|Serena WilliamsNaomi Osaka
Simona Halep
Petra Kvitová
|}

Other awards

Arthur Ashe Award for CourageBill RussellBest CoachJim CalhounBest ComebackSt. Louis Blues come from being at the bottom of the NHL standings to win the Stanley CupBest MomentRob Gronkowski, Lindsey Vonn and Dwyane Wade for their careersCapital One Cup
Men: Virginia CavaliersWomen: Stanford CardinalJimmy V AwardRob MendezPat Tillman Award for ServiceKirstie Ennis'''

In Memoriam
The 2019 ESPY Awards was the first time that there was no "In Memoriam" segment aired live. The segment was replaced by a segment honoring players' assistance within their communities with a performance of "In Times Like These" by Grammy award-winning Gospel singer Tori Kelly, taking place during the award segment for the Arthur Ashe Courage Award, which was awarded to NBA legend and Civil Rights activist Bill Russell. 

Niki Lauda
Charlie Whiting
Paul Allen
Peter Magowan
Gordon Banks
Fernando Clavijo
Florijana Ismaili
Jimmy Banks
Willie Mccovey
Scott Sanderson
Frank Robinson
Mel Stottlemyre
Don Newcombe
Jim Bouton
Bob Friend
Stan Mikita
Ted Lindsay
Luis Valbuena
Gino Marchetti
Tony Sparano
Forrest Gregg
J.D. Gibbs
Glen Wood
Kelly Catlin
José Castillo
 Wayde Sims 
 Tyler Trent
 C.J. Fuller
Joe Bellino
Gene Littler
Marilynn Smith
Bill Buckner 
Pat Bowlen
Tex Winter
Alex Spanos
Kwamie Lassiter
Gunther Cunningham 
Clem Daniels
Turk Schonert
Bart Starr
David Pearson
John Havlicek
John MacLeod
Jared Lorenzen
Wade Wilson
Gabriele Grunewald
Dale Greig
Lam Jones
Tyler Skaggs
Eusebio Pedroza
Pedro Morales
Gene Okerlund
Dan Jenkins
Rod Bramblett

References

External links
 ESPN: Serving sports fans. Anytime. Anywhere. – ESPN

2019
ESPY
ESPY
ESPY
ESPY
ESPY Awards